Periclimenes brevicarpalis, the glass anemone shrimp or peacock-tail anemone shrimp, is a species of shrimp belonging to the family Palaemonidae.

Description
Periclimenes brevicarpalis can reach a length of 0.5 to 1.0 inch. The body is almost transparent, with some white spots over carapace and tail and orange spots outlined in black over the caudal fin. Females are larger than males and have more white spots. This species lives symbiotically with sea anemones, corals and jelly fish.

Distribution
This species can be found in the tropical Pacific and Indian Oceans, including Australia.

References
 Bruce, A.J., 1976e. A report on some pontoniid shrimps collected from the Seychelles Islands by the F.R.V. Manihine, 1972, with a review of the Seychelles pontoniid shrimp fauna.— Zoological Journal of the Linnean Society 59: 89-153.

External links
 WoRMS
 Encyclopedia of Life
 Freshmarine

Palaemonidae
Crustaceans described in 1902